Big Fish is an Australian fishing show aired on One on 8 January 2012 hosted by Marc Vincent.

References

10 Bold original programming
2012 Australian television series debuts
Australian sports television series
Fishing television series
Recreational fishing in Australia